1983 in professional wrestling describes the year's events in the world of professional wrestling.

List of notable promotions 
These promotions held notable shows in 1983.

Calendar of notable shows

Notable events
January 22 - the Don Muraco-Pedro Morales rivalry reached its peak at Madison Square Garden in New York City when Muraco pinned Morales to become the new WWF Intercontinental champion.
 March 10–11 The WWF holds its first ever live events outside the Northeast in San Diego and Los Angeles, California
 The WWF now fully owned by Vince McMahon seceded from the National Wrestling Alliance at the annual NWA Convention.
 September 4 - WWF All-American Wrestling debut on the USA Network
 November 15 - Tony Atlas and Rocky Johnson made WWF history as they became the first African-Americans to win the WWF Tag Team Championship in a no-disqualification match against The Wild Samoans on WWE Championship Wrestling.
 December 26 - Iron Sheik managed by "Classy" Freddie Blassie defeated WWF World Heavyweight Champion Bob Backlund ending Backlund's nearly 5 year run when his manager Arnold Skaaland threw in his towel in New York, NY

Accomplishments and tournaments

NJPW

Awards and honors

Pro Wrestling Illustrated

Wrestling Observer Newsletter

Births
Date of birth uncertain:
Quicksilver 
January 8 – Chris Masters
January 18 - Adam Thornstowe 
January 21 – Maryse Ouellet
January 30 – Rockstar Spud
February 10:
Taiji Ishimori
Kevin Matthews 
February 21 – Wes Brisco
February 25 - Steven Lewington 
March 1 - Davey Richards
March 17 - Timothy Thatcher 
March 18 – Ethan Carter III
March 19 – Evan Bourne
March 26 - Mike Mondo 
March 30 – Zach Gowen
April 2 - Scorpio Sky  
April 5:
 Bushi 
 Chie Ishii 
April 27 - Lacey
May 1 - Human Tornado
May 7 - Tanga Loa
May 11 - Daizee Haze 
May 15 - Tom Lawlor
May 18 - Matt Riviera 
May 19 - Chris Van Vliet 
May 21 – Leva Bates 
May 23 – Alex Shelley
June 23 - Brandi Rhodes 
July 11 - Marcus Louis
July 15 – Heath Slater
July 24 - Joey Kovar (died in 2012) 
July 26 – Roderick Strong
August 3 - Ladybeard 
August 8 - Rampage Brown 
August 23 – J.C. Bailey (died in 2010)
August 24 – Tino Sabbatelli
September 6 – Sam Roberts
September 6 – Braun Strowman
September 16 – Jennifer Blake
September 30 - Pacman Jones 
October 1 – Robbie E
October 16 – Kenny Omega
October 19 – Robert Evans
October 22 – Taya Valkyrie
November 2 – Darren Young
November 8 - Lucky Cannon 
November 11 – Kristal Marshall
November 21 – Nikki Bella
November 21 – Brie Bella
November 25 - Kirby Mack 
November 28 – Summer Rae
November 28 - Gota Ihashi
November 29 -  Rosemary
December 15 – Rene Dupree
December 16 : 
Kris Travis (died in 2016) 
Jigsaw 
December 20 - Gia Allemand (died in 2013) 
December 22 – Luke Gallows
December 29 - El Desperado (wrestler)
December 30 - Eddie Edwards

Debuts
Uncertain debut date
Scott Armstrong
Desiree Petersen 
William Regal
Rick Steiner
Ben Bassarab
Ramón Álvarez (wrestler) 
March 5 - Cueball Carmichael
June 6 - Road Warrior Hawk
June 24 - Mick Foley

Retirements
Dean Ho (1962 - 1983)
Mikel Scicluna (1953 - 1983)

Deaths
February 7 - Miguel Ángel Delgado, 35
March 6 - Mayes McLain, 77
May 10 - Frank Tunney, 70
May 25 - Johnny Rougeau, 53
May 31 - Jack Dempsey, 87
October 12 - The Grand Wizard,  57
December 9 - Earl McCready, 78

See also
List of WCW pay-per-view events

References

 
professional wrestling